The Bulgarian Black Sea Coast, also known as the Bulgarian Riviera, covers the entire eastern bound of Bulgaria stretching from the Romanian Black Sea resorts in the north to European Turkey in the south, along 378 km of coastline. White and golden sandy beaches occupy approximately 130 km of the 378 km long coast. The region is an important center of tourism during the summer season (May–October), drawing millions of foreign and local tourists alike and constituting one of the country's most popular tourist destinations. Prior to 1989 the Bulgarian Black Sea coast was internationally known as the Red Riviera. Since the fall of the Iron Curtain, however, its nickname has been changed to the Bulgarian Riviera.

The Bulgarian Black Sea Coast has a humid subtropical climate (Köppen climate classification Cfa), with considerable maritime and continental influences. The area's average air temperature in the summer is about 28 °C, with the average water temperature at 26 °C. There are more than 240 hours of sunshine in May and September and more than 300 hours in July and August.

The Balkan Mountains cross the country reaching to the edge of the Black Sea at Cape Emine, dividing the coastline into a southern and northern part. Parts of Bulgaria's northern Black Sea Coast feature rocky headlands where the sea abuts cliffs up to 70 metres in height. The southern coast is known for its wide sandy beaches. The southernmost section is included in Strandzha Nature Park.

The two largest cities and main seaports on the Bulgarian Riviera are Varna (third largest in the country) and Burgas (fourth largest in the country). Varna is located on the northern part of the coast and Burgas is located on the southern coast. The two cities' international airports, Varna Airport and Burgas Airport, are the main hubs servicing the region. In addition, the Trakia motorway (A1) was completed in 2013, providing fast access between Burgas and Sofia, the capital of Bulgaria, and Plovdiv, the second largest city. Hemus motorway (A2), scheduled to be completed after 2020, would make the trip from Sofia to Varna substantially easier and faster, while the Cherno More motorway (A5) is planned to connect Varna and Burgas. Major road I-9 runs along the Black Sea coast between the border with Romania, at the village of Durankulak, and the city of Burgas.

Largest cities
 Varna
 Burgas
 Tsarevo
 Balchik
 Nesebar
 Kavarna
 Sozopol
 Pomorie

Major resorts and attractions
 Durankulak
 Krapets
 Shabla
 Tyulenovo
 Kamen Bryag
 Yaylata
 Rusalka
 Balgarevo
 Kavarna
 Bozhurets
 Beglik Tash
 Topola
 Tuzlata
 Albena
 Kranevo
 Golden Sands
 Golden Sands Nature Park
 Holiday Club Riviera
 Chaika
 Sunny Day (Kokodiva)
 Constantine and Helena
 Galata
 Fichoza
 Kamchia (resort)
 Kamchia (biosphere reserve)
 Shkorpilovtsi
 Karadere
 Byala
 Obzor
 Irakli
 Elenite
 Sveti Vlas
 Sunny Beach
 Ravda
 Pomorie
 Sarafovo
 Atia
 Chernomorets
 Kavatsite
 Dyuni
 Primorsko
 Kiten
 Lozenets
 Tsarevo
 Strandzha Nature Park
 Varvara
 Sinemorets
 Rezovo

Historic sites
 Aheloy
 Ahtopol
 Balchik
 Euxinograd
 Kaliakra
 Nesebar (UNESCO World Heritage Site)
 Sozopol

Islands
 St. Anastasia Island
 St. Cyricus Island
 St. Ivan Island
 St. Peter Island
 St. Thomas Island

Rivers
Aheloy
Batova
Dvoynitsa
Fakiyska
Hadzhiyska
Kamchiya
Provadiya
Rezovska
Ropotamo
Shkorpilovska
Veleka

See also
Tourism in Bulgaria

Riviera, featuring links to articles on the many coastal strips around the world which are known as Riviera
Romanian Black Sea resorts

References

 
Landforms of Burgas Province
Landforms of Varna Province
Landforms of Dobrich Province
Black Sea Coast
Coasts of the Black Sea